Brevin Adon Knight (born November 8, 1975) is an American former professional basketball point guard who played with nine teams in the National Basketball Association (NBA) from 1997 to 2009. Knight played college basketball at Stanford University and was drafted by the Cleveland Cavaliers in 1997. He is the brother of Brandin Knight.

He is currently a color commentator for the Memphis Grizzlies on Bally Sports Southeast.

High school career
Knight grew up in East Orange, New Jersey and attended Seton Hall Preparatory School in West Orange, New Jersey, leading its basketball team to New Jersey state championships his sophomore, junior, and senior years. He was named to the Newark Star-Ledger's All-State First Team. Lightly recruited out of high school, Knight was a late signee for Stanford University.

College career
Knight had a successful college career at Stanford, where he is the all-time leader in assists (780) and steals (298) and third all-time in scoring (1,714).  He was chosen by the Cleveland Cavaliers with the 16th pick in the 1997 NBA draft.

NBA career
Knight was drafted with the 16th pick of the first round in the 1997 NBA draft. In his rookie season, Knight led the NBA in steals per game and was named to the NBA All-Rookie First Team. He played for the Cavaliers, the Atlanta Hawks, the Memphis Grizzlies, the Phoenix Suns, the Washington Wizards, the Milwaukee Bucks, the Charlotte Bobcats, the Los Angeles Clippers, and the Utah Jazz, averaging 7.3 points and 6.1 assists per game in his career. On January 21, 2001, while on the Hawks, Knight scored a career-best 31 points while adding 10 rebounds, during a 94-90 loss to the Washington Wizards.

The Bobcats signed Knight via free agency in the 2004 NBA offseason. He was one of the best players on the expansion team during their inaugural 2004–05 NBA season, averaging 10.1 points, 9 assists, and 1.98 steals per game as the Bobcats went 18–64. Knight finished second in assists per game in the league, behind MVP Steve Nash. He was waived by the Bobcats on June 29, 2007 after spending three seasons with the team. On August 13, 2007, he signed a two-year contract with the Los Angeles Clippers. He was traded to the Utah Jazz on July 23, 2008 for Jason Hart.

NBA career statistics

Regular season

|-
| align="left" | 
| align="left" | Cleveland
| 80 || 76 || 31.0 || .441 || .000 || .801 || 3.2 || 8.2 || 2.5 || .2 || 9.0
|-
| align="left" | 
| align="left" | Cleveland
| 39 || 38 || 30.4 || .425 || .000 || .745 || 3.4 || 7.7 || 1.8 || .2 || 9.6
|-
| align="left" | 
| align="left" | Cleveland
| 65 || 46 || 27.0 || .412 || .200 || .761 || 3.0 || 7.0 || 1.6 || .3 || 9.3
|-
| align="left" | 
| align="left" | Cleveland
| 6 || 0 || 15.5 || .133 || .000 || .833 || 1.2 || 4.2 || 1.0 || .2 || 1.5
|-
| align="left" | 
| align="left" | Atlanta
| 47 || 43 || 29.0 || .385 || .100 || .817 || 3.4 || 6.1 || 2.0 || .1 || 6.9
|-
| align="left" | 
| align="left" | Memphis
| 53 || 11 || 21.7 || .422 || .250 || .757 || 2.1 || 5.7 || 1.5 || .1 || 7.0
|-
| align="left" | 
| align="left" | Memphis
| 55 || 4 || 16.9 || .425 || .250 || .541 || 1.5 || 4.2 || 1.3 || .0 || 3.9
|-
| align="left" | 
| align="left" | Phoenix
| 3 || 0 || 6.3 || .333 || .000 || .000 || 1.0 || 1.3 || 1.0 || .3 || .7
|-
| align="left" | 
| align="left" | Washington
| 32 || 12 || 18.7 || .420 || .200 || .704 || 1.9 || 3.2 || 1.6 || .0 || 4.3
|-
| align="left" | 
| align="left" | Milwaukee
| 21 || 1 || 20.0 || .438 || .333 || .789 || 2.3 || 4.7 || 1.4 || .0 || 5.9
|-
| align="left" | 
| align="left" | Charlotte
| 66 || 61 || 29.5 || .422 || .150 || .852 || 2.6 || 9.0 || 2.0 || .1 || 10.1
|-
| align="left" | 
| align="left" | Charlotte
| 69 || 67 || 34.1 || .399 || .231 || .803 || 3.2 || 8.8 || 2.3 || .1 || 12.6
|-
| align="left" | 
| align="left" | Charlotte
| 45 || 25 || 28.3 || .419 || .056 || .805 || 2.6 || 6.6 || 1.5 || .1 || 9.1
|-
| align="left" | 
| align="left" | L.A. Clippers
| 74 || 39 || 22.6 || .404 || .000 || .873 || 1.9 || 4.4 || 1.4 || .1 || 4.6
|-
| align="left" | 
| align="left" | Utah
| 74 || 0 || 12.7 || .349 || .000 || .750 || 1.2 || 2.6 || .9 || .1 || 2.4
|- class="sortbottom"
| style="text-align:center;" colspan="2"| Career
| 729 || 423 || 24.9 || .412 || .134 || .789 || 2.4 || 6.1 || 1.7 || .1 || 7.3

Playoffs

|-
| align="left" | 1998
| align="left" | Cleveland
| 4 || 4 || 33.0 || .286 || .000 || .600 || 4.0 || 5.8 || 2.5 || .3 || 4.5
|-
| align="left" | 2004
| align="left" | Milwaukee
| 5 || 0 || 20.2 || .261 || .000 || .818 || 2.2 || 3.4 || 2.8 || .2 || 4.2
|-
| align="left" | 2009
| align="left" | Utah
| 5 || 0 || 3.4 || .000 || .000 || .000 || .2 || .6 || .2 || .0 || .0
|- class="sortbottom"
| style="text-align:center;" colspan="2"| Career
| 14 || 4 || 17.9 || .255 || .000 || .714 || 2.0 || 3.1 || 1.8 || .1 || 2.8

Post-NBA 
Knight joined the Memphis Grizzlies broadcast team as a color commentator on Fox Sports Tennessee in 2010.

Personal life
Knight and his wife Deena have two daughters, Brenna and Kayla Knight and a son Donevin Knight.

See also

 List of National Basketball Association players with most assists in a game

Notes

External links
NBA.com Profile – Brevin Knight

Assist by Knight Foundation

1975 births
Living people
African-American basketball players
All-American college men's basketball players
American men's basketball players
Atlanta Hawks players
Basketball players from New Jersey
Charlotte Bobcats players
Cleveland Cavaliers draft picks
Cleveland Cavaliers players
Los Angeles Clippers players
Memphis Grizzlies announcers
Memphis Grizzlies players
Milwaukee Bucks players
People from Livingston, New Jersey
Phoenix Suns players
Point guards
Seton Hall Preparatory School alumni
Sportspeople from Essex County, New Jersey
Stanford Cardinal men's basketball players
Utah Jazz players
Washington Wizards players
21st-century African-American sportspeople
20th-century African-American sportspeople